Animals is a 2012 Spanish drama film directed by Marçal Forés.

Cast
Oriol Pla - Pol
Augustus Prew - Ikari
Dimitri Leonidas - Mark
Roser Tapias - Laia
Javier Beltrán - Llorenç
Martin Freeman - Albert

References

External links 

2012 films
2012 drama films
Spanish drama films
2010s Catalan-language films
Magic realism films
Films scored by Natalie Holt
2010s Spanish films